Amador may refer to:

People
Amador (name)

Places 
Amador County, California
Amador City, California 
Amador, Panama
Lake Amador, a reservoir
Amador Valley, Alameda County, California
Dougherty, Alameda County, California, formerly called Amador's
Dublin, California, formerly called Amador
Amador Township, Minnesota
Fort Amador, a former U.S. Army post in Panama

Other
Amador (film), a 2010 Spanish film
 Amador, a fictional city in the Wheel of Time fantasy novel series
 Amador (football club), São Tomé and Príncipe
 USS Amador (AK-158), U.S. Navy cargo ship

See also
 Amador Central Railroad, a defunct California railroad